William Rowen Elementary School is a historic elementary school located in the West Oak Lane neighborhood of Philadelphia, Pennsylvania. It is a part of the School District of Philadelphia.

It was designed by Irwin T. Catharine and built in 1937–1938.  It is a two-story, five bay, brick building in a Georgian Revival / Moderne-style.  It features a large stone entrance and truncated steeple.

It was added to the National Register of Historic Places in 1988.

Feeder patterns
Rowen feeds into King High School.

References

External links
 William Rowen School
 William Rowen Elementary School at the School District of Philadelphia
 

School buildings on the National Register of Historic Places in Philadelphia
Georgian Revival architecture in Pennsylvania
Moderne architecture in Pennsylvania
School buildings completed in 1938
West Oak Lane, Philadelphia
Public elementary schools in Philadelphia
School District of Philadelphia